Paramblymora is a genus of longhorn beetles of the subfamily Lamiinae, containing the following species:

 Paramblymora affinis Breuning, 1974
 Paramblymora sarasini Breuning, 1961

References

Desmiphorini